The C11 target model rifle is a competition weapon used by members of the Royal Canadian Army Cadets for training and target shooting competition.  It is based on the 5.56mm Anschütz Model 6522.

The C11 rifle is a 5.56-millimetre calibre, heavy fully floating barrel, manually operated, bolt-action, hand-fed, single-shot, competition weapon that fires 5.56×45mm NATO ammunition. The round is identical to that which is used in the C7, C8 and the C9 and as such will have similar ballistics. It has no applied safety and is fitted with RPA Vernier scaled aperture sights.

See also
RPA C12A1
Royal Canadian Army Cadets

References

External links
 Connaught National Army Cadet Summer Training Centre
 CASR guide to Canadian rifles

Rifles of Canada
Single-shot bolt-action rifles